In abstract algebra, Hilbert's Theorem 90 (or Satz 90) is an important result on cyclic extensions of fields (or to one of its generalizations) that leads to Kummer theory.

Examples 
Let  be the quadratic extension . The Galois group is cyclic of order 2, its generator  acting via conjugation:

An element  in  has norm . An element of norm one thus corresponds to a rational solution of the equation  or in other words, a point with rational coordinates on the unit circle. Hilbert's Theorem 90 then states that every such element a of norm one can be written as

where  is as in the conclusion of the theorem, and c and d are both integers. This may be viewed as a rational parametrization of the rational points on the unit circle. Rational points  on the unit circle  correspond to Pythagorean triples, i.e. triples  of integers satisfying .

Cohomology
The theorem can be stated in terms of group cohomology: if L× is the multiplicative group of any (not necessarily finite) Galois extension L of a field K with corresponding Galois group G, then

Specifically, group cohomology is the cohomology of the complex whose i-cochains are arbitrary functions from i-tuples of group elements to the multiplicative coefficient group, with differentials  defined in dimensions  by:

where  denotes the image of the -module element  under the action of the group element .
Note that in the first of these we have identified a 0-cochain , with its unique image value . 
The triviality of the first cohomology group is then equivalent to the 1-cocycles  being equal to the 1-coboundaries , viz.:

Equating these gives the original version of the Theorem. 

A further generalization is to cohomology with non-abelian coefficients: that if H is either the general or special linear group over L, including , then  Another generalization is to a scheme X:

There is yet another generalization to Milnor K-theory which plays a role in Voevodsky's proof of the Milnor conjecture.

Proof
Let  be cyclic of degree  and  generate . Pick any  of norm 

By clearing denominators, solving  is the same as showing that  has  as an eigenvalue. We extend this to a map of -vector spaces via

Since  has minimal polynomial 

we can identify

 

via 

 

Under this identification, our map becomes

That is to say under this map 

 is an eigenvector with eigenvalue  iff  has norm .

References

Chapter II of J.S. Milne, Class Field Theory, available at his website .

External links

Theorems in algebraic number theory